Cengage Group is an American educational content, technology, and services company for the higher education, K-12, professional, and library markets. It operates in more than 20 countries around the world.

Company information
The company is headquartered in Boston, Massachusetts, and has approximately 5,000 employees worldwide across nearly 38 countries. It was headquartered at its Stamford, Connecticut, office until April 2014.

Gale is Cengage's library reference arm and specializes in e-research and educational publishing for libraries, schools and businesses. The company creates and maintains databases that are published online, in print, as e-books and in microform.

Cengage Unlimited

On December 5, 2017, Cengage announced Cengage Unlimited, a subscription service that allows students to pay for access to the company's entire digital higher education catalog by the semester or year, rather than buying individual textbooks. This service became available during summer 2018, and was reported to be "in line with expectations" with its initial sales goal. The University of Missouri is the first university to offer this plan to all students, effective January 2019.

History
International Thomson Publishing entered the publishing business by buying Wadsworth Publishing in 1979. In 1981, International Thomson purchased the publishing operations of Litton Industries, including Van Nostrand Reinhold and Delmar. International Thomson acquired reference publisher Gale Research in 1985. International Thomson acquired South-Western Publishing from SFN in 1986. In 1992, Thomson acquired Course Technology. In 1995, Thomson acquired educational reference publisher Peterson's. In 1997, Van Nostrand Reinhold was sold to John Wiley & Son.

In 2000, Thomson Learning was created out of a restructuring of International Thomson Publishing. Later that year Thomson acquired the higher education title of Harcourt from Reed Elsevier, and the test prep publisher Arco from IDG Books. In 2002, Wadsworth acquired F.E. Peacock Publishers. It was announced on October 25, 2006 that Thomson Learning would be offered for sale by the Thomson Corporation, with an estimated value of up to US$5 billion. The company was bought by a private equity consortium consisting of Apax Partners and OMERS Capital Partners for US$7.75 billion, and the name was changed to Cengage Learning on 24 July 2007. In 2007, Cengage Learning sold Peterson's to Nelnet. In 2011, Cengage Learning acquired the National Geographic Society's school publishing unit, and combined this school business with the Global ELT business to create and launch the National Geographic Learning brand. The global brand combined the former Cengage Learning ELT and National Geographic School Publishing imprints and sub-brands under one unified identity.

In September 2013, David Shaffer retired as chairman of the company. He had previously been executive vice president of The Thomson Corporation from 2005 to 2006, and then President and CEO of both Thomson Publishing International and Thomson Learning. 

The company had acquired a large amount of debt through the course of its initial buyout and subsequent acquisitions, and had seen declining revenue through a shrinking market for paper textbooks. Cengage Learning filed for bankruptcy under Chapter 11 on July 2, 2013. Cengage Learning emerged from bankruptcy on April 1, 2014, eliminating approximately $4 billion of its funded debt and securing $1.75 billion in exit financing. Post-bankruptcy, the company decided to focus on developing digital study guides and other educational supplements, as well as hard-copy textbooks. The company moved its headquarters from Stamford, Connecticut, to Boston.

In January 2015, they announced expansion of their LearnLaunch Accelerator program, which provides seed funding and intensive coaching to promising startups, to the University of Chihuahua in Mexico.

In November 2016, Cengage Learning rebranded as simply Cengage. 

In May 2019, Cengage announced its potential merger with another major publisher, McGraw-Hill Education, thereby creating a duopoly with Pearson in the market and would have used McGraw-Hill as the merged corporate name with Michael Hansen as CEO. It is estimated 
Cengage has 24% of the market while McGraw-Hill has 21%, Pearson, the current market leader, has about 40 percent of the market and Wiley has about 7 percent.

The merger was called off on 1 May 2020.

In August 2021, Cengage rebranded as Cengage Group.

Acquisitions
In addition to organic growth, Cengage has expanded through acquisitions within the publishing industry. Notable acquisitions include:

Brands/imprints
The company's product lines include 4LTR Press, Aplia, Cengage Learning PTR, Chilton, Education To Go, Gale, Milady, MindTap, and National Geographic Learning.

Since 2015, South-Western products have been branded as Cengage Learning.

Cengage Unlimited, a SaaS solution, launched on August 1, 2018.

Rankings
In 2016, based on its 2015 revenues, Publishers Weekly ranked the company 14 out of 57 publishers worldwide, a decline of three slots from the previous year. The list includes both trade and educational publishers.

See also
 Books in the United States

References

External links
 
 National Geographic Learning, part of Cengage Learning
 ed2go, part of Cengage Learning

 
American companies established in 2007
Book publishing companies based in Massachusetts
Educational publishing companies of the United States
Textbook publishing companies
Companies based in Boston
Education companies established in 2007
Publishing companies established in 2007
2007 establishments in Massachusetts
Privately held companies based in Massachusetts
Apax Partners companies
Companies that filed for Chapter 11 bankruptcy in 2013